The Monaco men's national under-18 basketball team is a national basketball team of Monaco, administered by the Fédération Monégasque de Basketball. It represents the country in international men's under-18 basketball competitions.

The team won three medals at the FIBA U18 European Championship Division C. They competed in this competition for the first time in 2005.

FIBA U18 European Championship participations

See also
Monaco men's national basketball team
Monaco men's national under-16 basketball team
Monaco women's national under-18 basketball team

References

External links
Archived records of Monaco team participations

Basketball in Monaco
Basketball
Men's national under-18 basketball teams